Nichigai WHO, organized by Nichigai Associates, is a searchable database of over 300,000 historical and contemporary figures. The database was created to facilitate research related to publishers, mass communications, research institutes, libraries, and freelancers.

Nichigai Associates 

Nichigai Associates (日外アソシエーツ株式会社) was founded in 1965. Its purpose has been to facilitate the acquisition of accurate information. In 1969, Nichigai Associates started a technical information retrieval service and began publishing the encyclopedias, indices, and directories. Following the current digitalization, its main service has been various online databases, such as WHO series, MAGAZINEPLUS and BOOKPLUS, among others. The databases focus on providing the information regarding prominent figures, bibliographies, magazines, awards, translation, and other reference materials.

Nichigai WHO Series 

Nichigai WHO has four series: WHO I, WHO II, WHO III, Sakka shippitsusha jinbutsu file (作家・執筁E��E��物ファイル, lit. Writers EFile), and the latest WHOPLUS.　This WHO series is divided by fields of occupational activity. WHO I catalogs important figures in economics, society, and politics, WHO II in academic research, literary, and journalism, and WHO III in arts, entertainment, and sports. The Sakka shippitsusha jinbutsu file compiles over 36,000 writers, critics, journalists, and researchers in humanities and social sciences from Meiji period to the present. However, the Sakka shippitsusha jinbutsu file service had finished in March 2006.

Nichigai WHOPLUS

WHO and Jinbutsu Odan File

Nichigai WHOPLUS is divided into two categories: WHO and Jinbutsu odan file (人物ファイル横断, lit. Figures Cross-reference). WHO provides a full text search with the option to post limits while Jinbutsu odan file searches name headings and full text.

WHO

WHO is a database that catalogs profiles and bibliographic information of over 260,000 prominent figures. The profiles includes their notations and readings of names, occupations and position titles, date of birth and death, academic backgrounds, personal history, and awards among others.

Two search methods are available: one is the full text search (全文検索) and the other is the advanced search (条件指定, lit. search by limiting the subjects). If searching Tsuda Umeko by full text, 19 figures related to Tsuda Umeko will be displayed as the search results. If searching Tsuda Umeko, limiting by female, deceased, and Japanese, only Tsuda Umeko will appear as the result. Subject includes full text search by profile, name of the figure, gender, living or deceased, the area of occupational activity, the year of birth and death, place of employment, position title, contact information, hometown, affiliated college, and nationality.

Bibliographic information of the figures are divided into three parts; Jinbutsu bunken, Tosho, and Kiji ronbun. Jinbutsu bunken (人物文献, lit. Literature Concerning Figures) catalogs the books and articles writing about the searched figure. Tosho (図書, lit. Book) and Kiji ronbun (記事・論文, lit. Magazine and Academic Articles) lists the books and articles that the searched figure wrote. Search results in Tosho and Kiji ronbun are based on the results of BOOKPLUS and MAGAZINEPLUS. The result page lists the National Diet Library call numbers which facilitate the book and article search at NDL.

Jinbutsu Odan File

Jinbutsu odan file is a database that combines the function of WHO database with five other databases:

Jinbutsu reference jiten (人物レファレンス事典, lit. Figure Reference Dictionary) lists 148,884 Japanese and 104,677 non-Japanese historical and current prominent figures. It catalogs which dictionaries and encyclopedias the figures are introduced in what indexes. 
Jiten kindai nihon no senkusha (事典近代日本の先駆者, lit. Dictionary for Modern Japanese Pioneers) catalogs approximately 1,100 Japanese pioneers who invented, released, founded, or experienced something as the first Japanese.
Umi wo koeta nihonjinmei jiten (海を越えた日本人名事典, lit. Dictionary for Japanese Who Traveled Abroad) catalogs over 1,600 Japanese who made oversea journeys during the 16th century to the 1890s.
Chosho and chosha joho (著書・著者情報, lit. Bibliographic Information) catalogs figures’ bibliographic information based on the search results from BOOKPLUS. 
Nichigai sentei koshiki URL shu (日外選定公式ＵＲＬ集, lit. URL Collection) lists the URL of figures selected exclusively by staff of WHO.

Characteristics 

WHO includes not only scholars but also actors, artists, athletes, musicians, politicians, and writers. Although there is no indication of the time range, it roughly covers from ancient times to the present.  Unlike printed encyclopedias, information provided in WHO is updated. The bibliographic information page is marked with date of the last update. Nevertheless, the frequency of the update varies. Some bibliographic information was last updated in 1988, while others in 2005.  The bibliographic information provided in WHO is self provided and verified by each figure for accuratacy, except for deceased, non-Japanese, and public figures.

Advanced search allows the users to limit various subjects in order to find the figures. One may search for a certain type of person without specifying any names. For instance, by checking female, deceased, Japanese, musician, and Naha-shi, five deceased female musicians in Naha-shi, Okinawa, will be found.

Other Resource for Bibliographic Information 

The Japan Biographical Encyclopedia and Who's Who. First Edition. The Rengo Press, 1958. 
Motoji, Niwa. Nihon seishi daijiten. Tokyo: Kadokawa Shoten, 1985. 
Dai jinmei jiten. Heibonsha, 1953–1955.
皓星社データベース

See also 
 Zasshi Kiji Sakuin
 Researching Japanese names at Wikibooks

External links
 Nichigai WHO

Online person databases